Transtillaspis obvoluta is a species of moth of the family Tortricidae. It is found in Peru.

The wingspan is about 25 mm. The ground colour of the forewings is brownish cream, slightly suffused with brownish basally and dorsally and strigulated (finely streaked) with brown. The markings are dark brown with yellowish brown parts, edged with cream. The hindwings are pale brownish.

Etymology
The species name refers to the forewing markings and is derived from the Latin word obvoluta (meaning edged).

References

Moths described in 2010
Transtillaspis
Taxa named by Józef Razowski